Berenice Restituyo (born ) is a retired Dominican Republic female volleyball player.

She was part of the Dominican Republic women's national volleyball team at the 1998 FIVB Volleyball Women's World Championship in Japan.

References

External links
http://www.gettyimages.com/detail/news-photo/sofia-mercedes-of-the-dominican-repubic-celebrates-winning-news-photo/51616138#sofia-mercedes-of-the-dominican-repubic-celebrates-winning-a-point-picture-id51616138

1977 births
Living people
Dominican Republic women's volleyball players
Place of birth missing (living people)